The Pârâul Galben (also: Galbenu) is a left tributary of the river Gilort in Romania. It discharges into the Gilort in Bălcești.

Tributaries

The following rivers are tributaries to the Pârâul Galben (from source to mouth):
Left: Zănoaga, Băița
Right: Mușet, Florile Albe, Bâzgele, Zmeura, Rudi

References

Rivers of Romania
Rivers of Gorj County